Mama Sita's Holding Company, Inc. (founded as Marigold Commodities Corporation) is a Philippine based manufacturer of condiments, selling its products under the brand, Mama Sita's. The brand is named after Teresita "Mama Sita" C. Reyes, matriarch of the company's founders, the spouses Bartolome B. Lapus and Clara C. Reyes-Lapus.

Mama Sita's products are available abroad such as in supermarket shelves in North America, Canada, Australia, New Zealand, and European countries. They also distribute in Hong Kong, Singapore, Thailand, Malaysia, Japan, Korea, India and Pakistan. The Middle East is the biggest market with the Kingdom of Saudi Arabia, the United Arab Emirates, Kuwait, and Qatar as major consumers.

About Teresita Reyes
Teresita "Mama Sita" C. Reyes was born in Manila on May 11, 1917, the eldest child of Justice Alex Reyes and Engracia "Aling Asiang" Cruz-Reyes, founder of The Aristocrat Restaurant. She had an interest in Filipino food and raised a business devoted to creating recipes and selling sauce mixes, vinegars and sauces. Reyes and her company became well known in the Philippines and amongst Filipinos living abroad. In 2013, a 10 peso postage stamp was issued in honor of her memory by the Philippine government. At least two Mama Sita cookbooks have been produced, Mama Sita's Cookbook (1996) and Mama Sita's Homestyle Recipes (2010).

Mama Sita's Products

Liquid

Mixes and Sauces

Flavors and Juices
Mama Sita's Samalamig Pandan
Mama Sita's Samalamig Brown Cane Sugar
Mama Sita's Samalamig Muscovado

References

External links
 Mama Sita official website

Philippine brands
Food and drink companies of the Philippines
Philippine condiments
Brand name condiments
Companies based in San Juan, Metro Manila
Condiment companies of the Philippines
Philippine companies established in 1980
Food and drink companies established in 1980